Dhahran Tower is a luxurious and well furnished Apartment Tower situated in Khobar, Saudi Arabia.  It is the tallest building in the Eastern Province. Provides 2 bedroom and 3 bedroom fully furnished luxury apartments.

Overview
Dhahran Tower was opened on 7 June 2012. The cost of the tower, owned by Saudi Arabian businessman Mubarak Al Suwaiket, is SR 350 million. He constructed the tower.

It is a multi-facilitated building with 46 floors and is located on the Dammam-Khobar Highway, opposite to DHL Express, The tower is 200m-high and houses 291 two and three bedroom apartments. There are five elevators in the tower.

References

2012 establishments in Saudi Arabia
Residential buildings completed in 2012
Khobar
Residential skyscrapers in Saudi Arabia
Skyscraper office buildings in Saudi Arabia